The 2015 Red Bull Air Race of Spielberg was the sixth round of the 2015 Red Bull Air Race World Championship season, the tenth season of the Red Bull Air Race World Championship. The event was held at the Red Bull Ring, in Spielberg, Austria.

After nine previous podium finishes, Australian pilot Matt Hall took his first Air Race victory by 0.057 seconds ahead of championship leader Paul Bonhomme, while American Kirby Chambliss took his first podium since June 2010 in third place. In the Challenger class, French pilot Mikaël Brageot took his first victory of the season, finishing 0.126 seconds clear of Petr Kopfstein.

Master Class

Qualification

Constant poor weather conditions, including heavy rain and low clouds forced the Race Committee to cancel the Qualifying round. According to the official rules, the start list of the Round of 14 on Sunday was based on the pre-event World Championship rankings.

Round of 14

 Pilot received 1 second in penalties.
 Pilot received 2 seconds in penalties.
 Pilot received 3 seconds in penalties.
 Pilot received 7 seconds in penalties.

Round of 8

 Pilot received 2 seconds in penalties.

Final 4

Challenger Class

Results

Standings after the event

Master Class standings

Challenger Class standings

 Note: Only the top five positions are included for both sets of standings.

References

External links

|- style="text-align:center"
|width="35%"|Previous race:2015 Red Bull Air Race of Ascot
|width="30%"|Red Bull Air Race2015 season
|width="35%"|Next race:2015 Red Bull Air Race of Fort Worth
|- style="text-align:center"
|width="35%"|Previous race:2014 Red Bull Air Race of Spielberg
|width="30%"|Red Bull Air Race of Spielberg
|width="35%"|Next race:2016 Red Bull Air Race of Spielberg
|- style="text-align:center"

Spielberg
Red Bull Air Race World Championship